Debra Ann H. Lehrmann (born November 16, 1956) is a justice of the Texas Supreme Court, the court of last resort for civil and juvenile matters located in the capital city of Austin in the U.S. state of Texas. She is a former 360th Judicial District Court judge from Fort Worth.

Background
Debra Lehrmann (née Herman) is a native of Harris County and was raised in Baytown, Texas. A member of Phi Beta Kappa, she graduated with high honors in 1979 from the University of Texas at Austin. In 1982, she received her Juris Doctor degree from the University of Texas School of Law. Prior to her appointment to the bench, she practiced family law with the Fort Worth law firm of Law, Snakard & Gambill.  In 1990, she was named the "Outstanding Young Lawyer of Tarrant County." In 2003, she was cited by the Texas Bar Foundation for having written the "best bar journal article" of the year. An active member of the Family Law Section of the American Bar Association (ABA), she served as chair of the Section in 2010-2011 and as the Judicial Liaison to the Judicial Division of the ABA. She previously served on the Executive Committee of the Section Officers Conference of the ABA. Lehrmann served on the drafting committee for the ABA Standards of Practice for Lawyers Representing a Child in Abuse and Neglect Cases.  She also serves as a representative of the State of Texas on the Uniform Law Commission, which drafts uniform laws for states to consider enacting.

On the state district court, Lehrmann specialized in family issues and abuse cases. Prior to judicial office, she was in private practice and served as the lead attorney and director of the Enforcement Division of the Tarrant County Domestic Relations Office.

She and her husband, Greg Lehrmann, have two adult sons. The family resides in Colleyville near Fort Worth in Tarrant County. They are active members of the First United Methodist Church of Colleyville.

On May 21, 2020, she disclosed via Twitter that she and her husband tested positive for COVID-19. On June 17, 2020 she disclosed via Twitter that she and her husband had both recovered, now tested negative, and would be donating their plasma.

Political life

In the general election held on November 2, 2010, Lehrmann, a Republican, won the Place 3 position on the Texas Supreme Court by defeating her Democratic opponent, Jim Sharp of Houston. Lehrmann polled 2,902,003 votes (59.9 percent) to Sharp's 1,805,837 (37.3 percent). A Libertarian, William Bryan Strange, III, polled the remaining 138,579 ballots (2.9 percent). Earlier she had won a primary runoff against Rick Green, a former member of the Texas House of Representatives, who staged an unsuccessful comeback attempt for the Place 5 seat on the court in 2016.

Lehrmann succeeded Justice Harriet O'Neill on the all-Republican body. When O'Neill stepped down in June 2010, with more than six months left in her six-year term, then Governor Rick Perry appointed Lehrmann to fill the vacancy.

Lehrmann won renomination to a second term in the Republican primary on March 1, 2016. In the contested primary race, she defeated Justice Michael Christopher Massengale (born c. 1972), a sitting member of the First Court of Appeals in Houston. Lehrmann received the endorsement of the Houston Chronicle, which called her "a hard working and respected justice with impeccable credentials." She was also backed by the United Republicans of Harris County. In January 2016, Justice Lehrmann polled 64 percent in a Republican straw poll in Tarrant County. She also received major party endorsements in Williamson County.

With Republican primary turnout reaching a record level, Lehrmann prevailed over contender Massengale, who had accused her for not being conservative enough in her judicial work on the court, by nearly 100,000 votes, winning 1,130,137 (52.2%) to 1,034,609 (47.8%).

Lehrmann did well statewide and won comfortable majorities in her home county of Tarrant and her opponent's home county of Harris.[12] In the November 8 general election, Lehrmann, with 4,807,986 votes (54.8 percent), defeated the Democrat Mike Westergren, who tallied 3,378,163 (38.5 percent). The remaining 6.6 percent of the ballots case went to the nominees of the Libertarian and Green parties, Kathie Glass and Rodolfo Rivera Munoz, respectively.

References

1956 births
Living people
Texas state court judges
Texas lawyers
People from Fort Worth, Texas
Texas Republicans
People from Baytown, Texas
University of Texas School of Law alumni
Justices of the Texas Supreme Court
20th-century American lawyers
21st-century American lawyers
20th-century American judges
21st-century American judges
American United Methodists
20th-century Methodists
21st-century Methodists
20th-century American women judges
21st-century American women judges